Fenwick is a census-designated place (CDP) in eastern Nicholas County, West Virginia, United States, adjacent to and immediately west of Richwood. As of the 2010 census, its population was 116. The town is situated at the bottomland surrounding the mouth of the Big Laurel Creek at its confluence with the Cherry River and has an elevation of 649 m (2129 ft). Fenwick is also the location of the convergence of three state highways: WV 55, WV 39, and WV 20 and acts as the western terminus of the Highland Scenic Highway.

References

Census-designated places in Nicholas County, West Virginia
Census-designated places in West Virginia